Xanthostemon sulfureus is a species of plant in the family Myrtaceae. It is endemic to New Caledonia.  It is threatened by habitat loss.

References

Endemic flora of New Caledonia
sulfureus
Vulnerable plants
Taxonomy articles created by Polbot